Chettinad Vidyasharam is a co-educational, independent day school located in Chennai, India. It was founded in 1986 by Kumara Rani of Chettinad, Meena Muthiah, a prominent Chennai based philanthropist, and educationalist. The school is a long-cherished dream of Muthiah, whose vision was to start an educational institution combining the virtues of art and culture, which will endeavour to raise the integrated child who is not dwarfed by consideration of caste, creed or community. The CBSE affiliated school, located in the upscale neighbourhood of MRC Nagar, is one of the country's largest private day schools in terms of campus size and Student enrollment. It has around 8,000 students enrolled in its primary, high and higher secondary classes.

Chettinad Vidyasharam has consistently been ranked as one of the best schools in India and among the top ten day schools nationwide by renowned educational agencies. In 2014, the school was ranked as the 'Best School in Chennai' by The Times of India, which commissioned the country's foremost market research group IMRB International to survey 150 schools in Chennai, and rank them on the basis of five parameters: academic performance, infrastructure, teaching quality, sports facilities, and use of technology.

Annual events

Maithri 

Maithri is a biennial cultural festival hosted by Chettinad Vidyasharam. Touted to be one of South India's largest school cultural fests, with a budget of over ₹20 Lakhs ($35,000), the event attracts students from across the state.

The fest, consisting of events ranging from Creative Writing to Channel Surfing, is fiercely competed by students, who are evaluated by celebrity judges. P.S.Senior Secondary School, Mylapore are the defending champions of Maithri.

Trishna 

Trishna is a biennial science fair organised by Chettinad Vidyasharam. It is a platform for aspiring scientists to put forth their innovative ideas. The science fair attracts young minds from different cities, who throng to witness the creativity and magnificence on display.

Dr. APJ Abdul Kalam was the Chief Guest of the event in 2007.

CVMUN 

Chettinad Vidyasharam Model United Nations is one of the country's largest student-run conferences, where over 500 students partake in as diplomats, to understand the intricacies and nuances of International Relations.

In 2015, the conference had a footfall of 564 students, making it the largest school MUN in all of South India. The 3-day Conference is recognised by the United Nations Information Centre for India and Bhutan

In Popular Media and Culture

 A few portions of Rajnikanth's 2016 film Kabali was shot in the school premises.
 K.S.Ravikumar's 2009 film, Aadhavan, starring Surya, was shot in the school's adjoining Chettinad Palace. 
 The school also features in director Shankar's 2003 coming-of-age film Boys.
 Portions involving Jyothika from the film Kaakha Kaakha (2003), where she played a teacher, were shot in the school.

Notable alumni

 G.V Prakash, Film Actor and Music Director
 Lakshmipathy Balaji, Former Cricketer 
 Saindhavi, Playback Singer
 Apoorva Arora, Actor
 Aishwarya R. Dhanush, Film Director
 Dinesh Karthik, Indian Team Cricketer
 Rana Daggubati, Film Actor
 Gautham Karthik, Film Actor
 Mahat Raghavendra, Film Actor 
 Minisha Lamba, Film Actress
 Allari Naresh, Film Actor
 Ashwin Kakumanu, Film Actor
 Saisharan, Playback Singer and Winner of Airtel Super Singer
 Manimaran Siddharth, Indian Cricketer
 Nakshatra Nagesh, Film Actress
 Shabeer Kallarakkal, Film Actor
 Bhavana Balakrishnan, Film Actress
 Kishen Das, Actor
 Padmalatha, Singer

References and notes

External links
 Official website

Primary schools in Tamil Nadu
High schools and secondary schools in Tamil Nadu
Schools in Chennai
Educational institutions established in 1986
1986 establishments in Tamil Nadu